The 2010 Patriot League men's basketball tournament was held at campus sites for the higher seeds. The quarterfinals were on March 3, the semi-finals on March 7, and the Championship was held on March 12, 2011. The winner of the tournament, Lehigh, received an automatic bid to the 2010 NCAA Men's Division I Basketball Tournament.

Bracket

References

Tournament
Patriot League men's basketball tournament
Patriot League men's basketball tournament